Vauxhall vehicles, past and present, sold under the Vauxhall brand.

Current and past production vehicles

Cars
10-4 Model H (1937–1947) 
12-4 Model I (1937–1946)
12-14 X (1904-)  
12-16 X (1904-)  
14 and 14-40 M & LM (1922–1927) 
14 ASY/ASX & DY/DX Light Six (1933–1939) 
14-6 Model J (1938–1948) Light Six
16 B (1909-)  
16-20 A (1912–1915) 
20 A (1908–1912) 
20 C Prince Henry (1911–1912) 
20 BY/BX Big Six (1934–1936) 
20-60 R & T (1927–1930) 
22 A (1912) 
22 C Prince Henry (1912–1914) 
23-60 OD (1922–1926) 
25 D (1912–1922) 
25 GY/GL Big Six (1937–1940) 
25-70 (1926–1928)
27 B (1910–1914) 
27 BXL Big Six (1934–1936) 
30 B (1910–1914) 
30-98 E & OE (1913–1922) 
35 B (1910–1914) 
80 T/T80 (1930-1932)  

A-type (1911–1914)
B-type (1910–1914)
C-type "Prince Henry" (1911–1913)
D-type (1912–1922)
E-type (1913–1922)

Adam (2013-2019)
Agila (2000–2015)
Albany
Ampera (2012-2015, rebadged Chevrolet Volt)
Antara (2006–2015)
Astra (1980–present)
Belmont (1986–1991)
Cadet (1931–1933)
Calibra (1990–1997)
Carlton (1978–1994)
Cavalier (1975–1995)
Chevette (1975–1984)
Corsa (1993–present)
Cresta (1954–1972)
Crossland X (2017–present)
Envoy (1960–1970), see Victor
Epic (1963–1970), see Viva
Equus (1978)
Firenza (1970–1975)
Frontera (1991–2004, rebadged Isuzu MU Wizard)
Grandland X (2017–present)
Insignia (2008–present)
Magnum (1973–1978)
Mokka (2012–present)
Monaro (2001–2005)
Monterey (1994–1999, rebadged Isuzu Trooper)
Meriva (2003–2017)
Nova (1983–1993)
Omega (1994–2003)
Royale (1978–1986), rebadged Opel Senator
Senator (1978–1994)
Signum (2003–2008)
Silver Aero (1983)
Silver Bullet (1976)
Sintra (1997-1999)
Six (1933–1938)
SRV (1970)
T and T80 (1930–1932)
Tigra (1994–2000, 2004–2009)
Vectra (1995–2008)
Trixx (2004)
Velox (1948–1965)
Ventora (1968–1972)
Viceroy (1978-1982), rebadged Opel Commodore
Victor (1957–1972)
Viscount (1966–1972)
Viva (1963–1979)
VX220 (2001–2005)
VX4/90 (1961–1972)
VX Lightning (limited edition VX220)
VXR8 (2007–2017)
Wyvern (1948–1957)
Zafira (1999–2015)
Zafira Tourer (2011–2018)

Vans
Bedford Beagle (1964–1973)
Bedford Astramax (1986–1993)
Bedford Rascal (1986–1993, rebadged Suzuki Supercarry)
Bedford CF 
Bedford Midi
Bedford Dormobile
Arena (1997–2000, rebadged Renault Trafic)
Combo (1994–present)
Movano 1/2 (1999–2021)
Movano 3 (2021-present)
Vivaro (2001–present)

See also
Vauxhall Motors

Vauxhall Motors

Vauxhall